Dieurostus is a genus of snake in the family Homalopsidae. The genus Dieurostus is monotypic, containing only the species Dieurostus dussumieri, commonly known as Dussumier's water snake, or the Kerala mud snake. The species, which is mildly venomous and rear-fanged, is endemic to Kerala, in southwestern India. It was formerly thought to be found in Bangladesh, although its distribution there is now disputed.

Etymology
Both the specific name, dussumieri, and the common name, Dussumier's water snake, are in honor of Jean-Jacques Dussumier, a French merchant, ship owner, and collector of zoological specimens.

Morphology
Diagnosis (genus): Dieurostus is distinguished from all other homalopsids with 25 or 27 rows of smooth scales, nasal scales in contact, and posterior labials horizontally divided, by its divided internasal, upper labials 1–3 contacting the loreal, five lower labials contacting the chin shields (Homalophis doriae has upper labials 2–5 or 2–6 contacting the loreal), and its striped pattern (Ferania sieboldii has a blotched-banded dorsal pattern, the internasal may contact the loreal, and it has three lower labials contacting the chin shields) [after Kumar et al. 2012].

Geographic range
D. dussumieri is endemic to coastal plains of southwestern India, in Kerala state.

Habits
D. dussumieri is a thoroughly aquatic snake, and is more evident during the rains. This species has been sighted in inundated rice paddies, flooded crop fields and is very much at home in lakes and swamps. On land, its movements are rather clumsy and laboured. It feeds mostly on fishes and takes refuge in crab-holes on mud banks and other such safe retreats near water bodies. It is oviparous.

References

Further reading
Berg, "Charles" (1901). "Herpetological Notes". Comunicaciones del Museo Nacional de Buenos Aires 1 (8): 289–291. (Dieurostus, new name, p. 290).
Boulenger GA (1896). Catalogue of the Snakes in the British Museum (Natural History). Volume III., Containing the Colubridæ (Opisthoglyphæ and Proteroglyphæ) ... London: Trustees of the British Museum (Natural History). (Taylor and Francis, printers). xiv + 727 pp. + Plates I-XXV. (Eurostus dussumieri, p. 19).
Duméril A-M-C, Bibron G, Duméril A[-H-A] (1854). Erpétologie générale ou histoire naturelle complète des reptiles. Tome septième [Volume 7]. Deuxième partie, comprenant l'histoire des serpents venimeux. Paris: Librairie Encyclopédique de Roret. pp. xii + 781–1536. (Eurostus dussumierii, new species, pp. 953–955).
Chandramouli SR, Sebastein JJ, Baiju, Ganesh SR (2012). "Expanded description of Enhydris dussumierii (Duméril, Bibron & Duméril, 1854) (Reptilia: Colubridae: Homalopsinae)". Taprobanica 4 (1): 42–47.
Kumar, A. Biju; Captain, Ashok (2011). "Recent records of the endemic Kerala mud snake, Enhydris dussumierii (Duméril, Bibron & Duméril, 1854) from India". Current Science 100 (6): 928–932.
Kumar AB, Sanders KL, George S, Murphy JC (2012). "The status of Eurostus dussumieri and Hypsirhina chinensis (Reptilia, Squamata, Serpentes): with comments on the origin of salt tolerance in homalopsine snakes". Systematics and Biodiversity 10 (4): 479–489. (Dieurostus dussumieri, new combination).
Smith MA (1943). The Fauna of British India, Ceylon and Burma, Including the Whole of the Indo-Chinese Sub-region. Reptilia and Amphibia. Vol. III.—Serpentes. London: Secretary of State for India. (Taylor and Francis, printers). xii + 583 pp. (Enhydris dussumieri, p. 389).

External links
 

Enhydris
Taxa named by Carlos Berg
Monotypic snake genera